"Anyway" is a single by American country music artist George Hamilton IV. Released in January 1971, it was the fourth single from his album Back Where It's At. The song peaked at number 13 on the Billboard Hot Country Singles chart. It also reached number 1 on the RPM Country Tracks chart in Canada.

Chart performance

References

1971 singles
George Hamilton IV songs
Song articles with missing songwriters